Tevita Michael Paula Ma'afu Koloamatangi (born 7 September 1988) is a New Zealand rugby union player. His position is flanker.

Career
As a result of his impressive showings during the 2013 ITM Cup, Koloamatangi was named in the  wider training squad ahead of the 2014 Super Rugby season.

In February 2017 he was signed by English Championship side London Irish until the end of the season.

Koloamatangi attended Nelson College in 2006.

In 2021 Koloamatangi returned to New Zealand and was called in to the  squad during the 2021 Bunnings NPC for a non competition match against .

References

External links
itsrugby.co.uk profile

1988 births
New Zealand rugby union players
New Zealand sportspeople of Tongan descent
Chiefs (rugby union) players
Rugby union flankers
Tasman rugby union players
People educated at Nelson College
Living people
Rugby union players from Auckland
Tonga international rugby union players
Skyactivs Hiroshima players
London Irish players